Souvenirs d'Italie is a 1957 Italian film. It stars actor Gabriele Ferzetti.

Cast
Isabelle Corey: Josette
June Laverick: Margaret
Ingeborg Schöner: Hilde
Gabriele Ferzetti: Lawyer Alberto Cortini
Massimo Girotti: Ugo Parenti
Alberto Sordi: Sergio Battistini
Vittorio De Sica: the Count
Dario Fo: Carlino 
Antonio Cifariello: Gino
Isabel Jeans: Cynthia
Mario Carotenuto
Francesco Mulè: Lawyer Andrea Mazzoni

References

External links

1957 films
Italian romantic comedy films
1950s Italian-language films
Films directed by Antonio Pietrangeli
1950s Italian films
1957 romantic comedy films